He Chengjun (June 20, 1882 – May 7, 1961) was a Kuomintang politician and military officer of the Republic of China. He was born in Hubei. He was graduate of the Imperial Japanese Army Academy. As a member of the Tongmenghui, he took part in the Xinhai Revolution. He was briefly mayor of Beijing after its capture by the National Revolutionary Army during the Northern Expedition. In the Second Sino-Japanese War, he was governor of his home province and defended it against the advancing Imperial Japanese Army. After the defeat of the Kuomintang in the Chinese Civil War, he went to Hong Kong and in 1951 arrived in Taiwan. He died in Taipei at the age of 78.

Awards and decorations

Order of the Sacred TripodOrder of the Cloud and Banner

References

Bibliography
 
 
 
 

1882 births
1961 deaths
Tongmenghui members
Members of the Kuomintang
People of the 1911 Revolution
Imperial Japanese Army Academy alumni
People of the Second Sino-Japanese War
People from Suizhou
Republic of China politicians from Hubei
Governors of Hubei
Mayors of Beijing
National Revolutionary Army generals from Hubei